Benno Wandolleck (18 April 1864 – 1930) was a German sports shooter and zoologist. He competed in the 30m team military pistol event at the 1912 Summer Olympics.

References

External links
 

1864 births
1930 deaths
German male sport shooters
19th-century German zoologists
Olympic shooters of Germany
Shooters at the 1912 Summer Olympics
Sportspeople from Gdańsk
20th-century German zoologists